Men's 800m races for wheelchair athletes at the 2004 Summer Paralympics were held in the Athens Olympic Stadium. Events were held in three disability classes.

T52

The T52 event consisted of 2 heats and a final. It was won by Abdellah Ez Zine, representing .

1st Round

Heat 1
24 Sept. 2004, 09:20

Heat 2
24 Sept. 2004, 09:28

Final Round
25 Sept. 2004, 19:35

T53

The T53 event consisted of 2 heats and a final. It was won by Richard Colman, representing .

1st Round

Heat 1
24 Sept. 2004, 19:00

Heat 2
24 Sept. 2004, 19:08

Final Round
25 Sept. 2004, 17:40

T54

The T54 event consisted of 3 heats and a final. It was won by Choke Yasuoka, representing .

1st Round

Heat 1
24 Sept. 2004, 09:40

Heat 2
24 Sept. 2004, 09:48

Heat 3
24 Sept. 2004, 09:56

Final Round
25 Sept. 2004, 19:20

References

M